The Players' Ring Theatre is a theater located in Portsmouth, New Hampshire, United States. The black box theater has a seating capacity of 75.

History

The theater is located within a historic brick building built in 1833 in an area that has since become Prescott Park. It was once a building of the Portsmouth Marine Railway Company, and was listed on the New Hampshire State Register of Historic Places in 2006. In 2013, the theater planned to replace the seats in order to expand the artistic possibilities of a black box environment.

Performances
The theater features work by new playwrights  as well as the established.

References

External links
Official website

Theatres in New Hampshire
Buildings and structures in Portsmouth, New Hampshire